Donal Ryan (born 1976) is an Irish writer. He has published six novels and one short story collection. In 2016, novelist and playwright Sebastian Barry described Ryan in The Guardian newspaper as "the king of the new wave of Irish writers". All of his novels have been number one bestsellers in Ireland.

Biography
Donal Ryan was born outside Nenagh, Tipperary, in 1976. He holds a degree in law from the University of Limerick where he now lectures in Creative Writing. He worked for the National Employment Rights Authority until April 2014. He is married and lives in Castletroy, County Limerick, with his wife and two children.

Ryan has won numerous awards for his fiction, among them the European Union Prize for Literature, the Guardian First Book Award and four Irish Book Awards, and has been shortlisted for several more, including the Costa Book Award and the IMPAC award. In September 2021 he became the first Irish writer to be awarded the Jean-Monnet Prize for European Literature.

His debut novel, The Spinning Heart, was longlisted for the Man Booker Prize in 2013, and his fourth novel, From A Low And Quiet Sea, was longlisted in 2018. The Spinning Heart was voted Irish Book of the Decade in 2016 in a nationwide poll run by Dublin Book Festival. He holds the record, at four, for most nominations for the International Dublin Literary Award. 

Ryan's first two novels, The Spinning Heart and The Thing About December, were between them rejected 47 times before being accepted for publication.  

The Thing about December (written before The Spinning Heart) was published in 2013 and was adapted into an Irish-language film, Foscadh, in 2020. It was also adapted for the stage by Decadent Theatre Company in 2019. The Spinning Heart was adapted by Articulate Anatomy Theatre Company in 2017 and staged at the Gaiety Theatre in Dublin. 

Ryan's books have been translated into over twenty languages.

Works
 The Spinning Heart (2012)
 The Thing about December (2013)
 A Slanting of the Sun: Stories (2015)
 All We Shall Know (Sept 2016)
 From a Low and Quiet Sea (2018)
 Strange Flowers (2020)
 The Queen of Dirt Island (2022)

Recognition 

 2012: Irish Book Awards, winner, Newcomer of the Year (The Spinning Heart)
 2012: Irish Book Awards, winner, Book of the Year (The Spinning Heart)
 2013: Irish Book Awards, shortlist, Novel of the Year (The Thing About December)
 2013: Man Booker Prize, longlist (The Spinning Heart)
 2013: Guardian First Book Award, winner (The Spinning Heart)
2014: International Dublin Literary Award, shortlist (The Spinning Heart)
 2015: European Union Prize for Literature (Ireland), winner (The Spinning Heart)
2015: Irish Book Awards, winner, Short Story of the Year (A Slanting Of The Sun)
2016: Irish Book Awards, shortlist, Novel of the Year (All We Shall Know)
2016: Dublin Book Festival, winner, Irish Book of the Decade (The Spinning Heart)
2017: Prix Jean Monnet de Littérature Européenne, shortlist (The Thing About December - French translation)
2018: Man Booker Prize, longlist (From a Low and Quiet Sea)
2018: Irish Book Awards, shortlist, Novel of the Year (From a Low and Quiet Sea)
2018: Costa Book Awards, shortlist (From a Low and Quiet Sea)
2019: Royal Society of Literature's Ondaatje Prize, longlist (From a Low and Quiet Sea)
2020: Irish Book Awards, winner, Novel of the Year (Strange Flowers)
2021: Prix Jean Monnet de Littérature Européene, winner (From a Low and Quiet Sea - French translation)
2021: Dalkey Literary Awards, Shortlist

References

1977 births
Living people
People from Nenagh
21st-century Irish writers
21st-century Irish male writers
21st-century Irish novelists
Date of birth missing (living people)